Gresham Technologies plc, known as Gresham Tech and formerly known as Gresham Computing plc, is a software and services company that specialises in providing real-time transaction control and enterprise data integrity solutions.  Listed on the main market of the London Stock Exchange GHT and headquartered in the City of London, customers include some of the world's largest financial institutions, all of whom are served locally from offices located in Europe, North America and Asia Pacific.

All Gresham's product development for its Clareti Platform is run out of its Innovation Labs, opened in the tech hub of Silicon Gorge, Bristol in September 2016.

In October 2016, Gresham acquired C24 Technologies Ltd,  a specialist in standards-based financial messaging and integration solutions.

In July 2018, Gresham acquired the B2 Group, specialists in bank-to-corporate integration and cash management software and focus on the growing multi-bank solutions market.

In July 2020, Gresham acquired Inforalgo, specialists in STP solutions for pre and post-trade

In May 2021, Gresham acquired Electra Information Systems,  a buy-side post-trade processing company with ability to improve efficiency and mitigate risk in reconciliation, data aggregation and transformation, trade settlement and client fee billing.

References

Companies based in the City of Westminster
Companies listed on the London Stock Exchange